José Alberto Amarilla Ayala (born 23 February 1985, in Resistencia) is an Argentinian football midfielder who plays for Independiente F.B.C.

Amarilla played previously for Sportivo Resistencia, in Colombia for Cúcuta Deportivo, in Brazil for Santa Helena Esporte Clube and in Paraguay for 12 de Octubre, Club Atlético 3 de Febrero and Olimpia Asuncion.

References

1985 births
Living people
People from Resistencia, Chaco
Argentine emigrants to Paraguay
Argentine footballers
Paraguayan expatriates in Colombia
Expatriate footballers in Colombia
Paraguayan footballers
Argentine expatriate sportspeople in Colombia
Association football midfielders
Club Olimpia footballers
Argentine expatriate sportspeople in Paraguay
Sarmiento de Resistencia footballers
Argentine expatriate footballers
Argentine expatriate sportspeople in Brazil
Club Atlético 3 de Febrero players
Expatriate footballers in Brazil
Cúcuta Deportivo footballers
Paraguayan expatriate sportspeople in Brazil
Expatriate footballers in Paraguay
Santa Helena Esporte Clube players
12 de Octubre Football Club players
Categoría Primera A players
Sportspeople from Chaco Province